Displacement field may refer to:

Displacement field (mechanics)
Electric displacement field